A Baltic Tragedy is a 1970 Swedish drama film directed by Johan Bergenstråhle. It was entered into the 20th Berlin International Film Festival. It is based on the Swedish extradition of Baltic soldiers that took place between 1945 and 1946.

Cast
 Bo Brundin as Eichfuss
 Yrjö Tähtelä as Lapa
 Anneli Sauli
 Knut Blom as Alksnis
 Jan Bergquist as actor
 Tore Lord as vicar
 Jonny Quantz
 Helge Skoog as actor

References

External links
 
 

1970 films
1970s Swedish-language films
1970 drama films
Films directed by Johan Bergenstråhle
Swedish drama films
1970s Swedish films